44 Magnum (stylized as 44MAGNUM) are a Japanese heavy metal band, originally formed in Osaka Prefecture in mid-1977. They were one of the first Japanese metal bands.

History
44 Magnum was originally formed in 1977 by vocalist Tatsuya "Paul" Umehara. After recruiting guitarist Satoshi "Jimmy" Hirose and bassist Hironori "Ban" Yoshikawa in 1979, the classic line-up was finalized when Satoshi "Joe" Miyawaki joined on drums in 1982. The band made their major label debut the following year with the album Danger. 44 Magnum disbanded in 1989.

After thirteen years, 44 Magnum reunited in 2002 and released their seventh album Ignition. Bassist Ban left the band in 2009. That year, they released a self-titled album that features La'cryma Christi member Shuse on bass and Paul's son Stevie as a lead singer along with Paul on most of the tracks.

In early 2012, frontman and sole original member Paul announced he would stop performing live with 44 Magnum to focus on treatment for Parkinson's disease, which he was diagnosed with in 2005. However, he continues to record and write songs with the band, and still makes live appearances. Bassist Ban returned to 44 Magnum for the 30th anniversary of their debut in 2013.

On February 3, 2022, 44 Magnum announced that Ban was no longer a part of the band. A little over a week later, Sexx George of the band Ladies Room was announced as support bassist.

Members
 Tatsuya "Paul" Umehara – vocals (1977–1989, 2002–present)
 Satoshi "Jimmy" Hirose – guitar (1979–1989, 2002–present)
 Satoshi "Joe" Miyawaki – drums (1982–1988, 2002–present)
 Stevie Umehara – vocals (2009–present)
 Sexx George – support bass (2022–present)

Former members
 Akira Nagamori – guitar
 Taka Tanaka – bass
 Hirofumi Miyamoto – drums
 Teruki Iga – drums (1979–1982)
 Shuse (La'cryma Christi) – bass (2009–2012)
 Anarchy Bad Ray – support bass (2010)
 Hironori "Ban" Yoshikawa – bass (1979–1989, 2002–2009, 2013–2022)

Timeline

Discography
Studio albums
 Danger (1983)
 Street Rock'n Roller (1984)
 Actor (1985)
 Love or Money (1987)
 Emotional Color (1988)
 Still Alive (1989)
 Ignition (2002)
 44Magnum (2009)
 Angel Number (2015)
 Prisoner (2019)

EPs
 44Magnum (1983)
 Four Figures (1985)
 Beast (2013)

Singles
 "It's Raining" (1987)
 "I Miss You" (1988)

Live albums
 The Live (1985, EP)
 Live Act II (1986)
 2016 04 03 04 Special Live (2017)

Compilations
 Anthology (1989)
 Live & Rare (2000, 10-CD boxset)
 The Bootleg-MK.I (2001, 2CD & DVD)
 The Bootleg-MK.II (2011, CD & DVD)
 44Magnum 35th Anniversary Ultimate Collection (March 21, 2012, SHM-CDs)
Includes Danger, Street Rock'n Roller, Actor, Live + Four Figures, Live Act II -Complete- and Ignition.

Videos
 The Beginning (1985)
 The Bootleg-MK.I (2001, DVD & 2CD)
 Live at Alive (2010)
 The Bootleg-MK.II (2011, DVD & CD)
 44Magnum on 30th Anniversary Tour 2013 Bombard Attack (2014)
 Bombard Attack 44Magnum on Tour 2014 2014.10.18 Tokyo (2015)
 2016 04 03 04 Special Live (2016)

References

External links
 Official website
 Official MySpace

Japanese heavy metal musical groups
Japanese hard rock musical groups
Musical groups established in 1977
Musical groups disestablished in 1989
Musical groups reestablished in 2002
Musical quintets
Musical groups from Osaka Prefecture